Ahmed Al-Sibai (born 6 January 1999) is a Qatari professional footballer who plays as a forward for Qatari club Al-Sailiya SC.

References

External links

Qatari footballers
1999 births
Living people
Al-Sailiya SC players
Qatar Stars League players
Place of birth missing (living people)